Glyphodes xanthonota is a moth in the family Crambidae. It was described by Edward Meyrick in 1936. It is found in the Democratic Republic of the Congo and Rwanda.

References

Moths described in 1936
Glyphodes